This is a list of Belgian television related events from 1967.

Events
25 February - Louis Neefs is selected to represent Belgium at the 1967 Eurovision Song Contest with his song "Ik heb zorgen". He is selected to be the twelfth Belgian Eurovision entry during Eurosong held at the Amerikaans Theater in Brussels.

Debuts

Television shows

Ending this year

Births
15 January - Peter van de Velde, actor
17 September - Koen Wauters, TV host

Deaths